Putney Library is a Grade II listed public library in the London Borough of Wandsworth.

Location 
The library is at numbers 5 to 7 on the north side of Disraeli road, just off Putney High street.

Founding 

The original building design was inspired by Norman Shaw and designed by Francis J Smith.  It was paid for by George Newnes, who established 'Tit-Bits' magazine, and was built by H. Roffey of Putney.  The library was opened in 1899 by Lord Russell of Killowen.

The building has three storeys and the original reading room has a vaulted roof, during World War Two the basement of the building was used as an Air Raid Patrol centre.

Wandsworth museum opened in the library building in 1986, but later moved to the Old County Court House in Garratt lane in 1996, and subsequently merged with Battersea Arts Centre.

Later development 
In 1977, a single storey extension was built, to the left of the main building, to house a children's library and a music library, at this time the entrance was still through the original building.

In 1997, the 70's extension was demolished and a glass one added with a new entrance, it was designed by Trevor Williams of Wandsworth Borough Council design service. The extension cost  £2,800,000, the floorspace was expanded to 2300 square metres and the original building's stone face was cleaned and restored.  The 90's extension won the Mayor's Award for accessibility for wheelchair 
users and those with hearing disability aids, it was also the Winner of the Public Library Building Award 1999 in the large refurbished library category.

In 2021, Wandsworth Borough Council proposed that the library become a community hub, including shared workspaces and a new community cafe.

Collection and resources 
There are over 20000 books in the library's collection and as a public library all books are free to borrow, but with limits on the numbers at any one time; there are charges for borrowing CDs and DVDs.

In 2020, the library had a book that was returned after 56 years, due back in 1964; it was sent from Athens, Greece.

The library also has a digital collection with online reference material, that can be accessed on the library website or the Libby app, in the building there are also computer terminals with free internet access, study rooms for both adults and children, and regular reading groups and other meetings.  MPs and local town Councillors also hold their surgeries in rooms in the building.

The Friends of Putney Library organise events and exhibitions in the library.

Access 
As of spring 2022, the library is open on Mondays, Wednesdays, Thursdays, from 09:00 to 20:00, on Fridays and Saturdays from 09:00 to 17:00, Sundays from 13:00 to 17:00, and it is closed on Tuesdays, there is ramp access from the Disraeli road pavement into the building, and there is a lift.

Transport 
The library is served by Transport for London buses 14, 39. 85, 93, 424, and 430 which stop at Putney Station on Putney High Street.  East Putney tube station (District line) is an 7-minute walk and Putney railway station (Southwestern Railway) is an 1-minute walk round the corner.

The Santander Cycles Putney rail station docking station is a 2-minute walk, there is also public cycle parking on Disraeli road.

References

External links 
 Better page on the library for the London Borough of Wandsworth

Grade II listed library buildings
Grade II listed buildings in the London Borough of Wandsworth
Libraries in the London Borough of Wandsworth
Putney
Library buildings completed in 1899
1899 establishments in England